The 1985 Copa Libertadores de América Finals was the final contested by Argentinian club Argentinos Juniors and Colombian América de Cali. The first leg of the tie was played on 17 October at Estádio Monumental, the second leg played on 22 October at Estadio Olímpico Pascual Guerrero, and the playoff on 24 October at Defensores del Chaco.

After both teams won one game each (by the same score, 1–0), Argentinos Juniors finally crowned champion in the playoff match held in Asunción. The Argentine side defeated América 5–4 via penalty shoot-out, therefore winning their first Copa Libertadores title.

Format
The finals was played over two legs; home and away. The team that accumulated the most points —two for a win, one for a draw, zero for a loss— after the two legs was crowned champion. If the two teams were tied on points after the second leg, a playoff in a neutral would become the next tie-breaker. Goal difference was used as a last resort.

Qualified teams

Venues

Match details

First leg

Second leg

Playoff

Aftermath

References

l
l
Copa Libertadores Finals
l
l
1985